Panikkos Xiourouppas (born September 4, 1968) is a Cypriot retired professional football player  and current football manager. He started his career in with Ermis Aradippou, while he played mainly for Omonoia and ended his career in Anorthosis Famagusta. He also played for AEK Larnaca.

Honours

Player

Club
Omonia
Cypriot First Division: 1986–87, 1988–89, 1992–93
Cypriot Cup: 1987–88, 1990–91, 1993–94
Cypriot Super Cup: 1987, 1988, 1989, 1991, 1994

Anorthosis Famagusta
Cypriot Cup: 2001–02, 2002–03

Individual
Performance
Cypriot First Division Top Goalscorer: 1990–91 (19 goals)

External links

1968 births
Living people
AC Omonia players
AEK Larnaca FC players
Anorthosis Famagusta F.C. players
Cypriot First Division players
Cypriot footballers
Cyprus international footballers
Greek Cypriot people
Association football forwards
Cypriot football managers
People from Larnaca District